The 2017–18 Central Arkansas Sugar Bears basketball team represented the University of Central Arkansas during the 2017–18 NCAA Division I women's basketball season. The Sugar Bears were led by sixth year head coach Sandra Rushing and played their home games at the Farris Center. They were members of the Southland Conference. They finished the season 25–10, 14–4 in Southland play to finish in third place. They advanced to the semifinals of the Southland women's tournament where they lost to Stephen F. Austin. They received an invite to the WBI where they defeated SIU Ewardsville, Weber State and Nevada in the first round, quarterfinals and semifinals to advanced to the championship game where they lost to Yale in the championship game.

Previous season
They finished the season 26–5 overall and 16–2 in Southland play to finish in first place. They won the Southland women's tournament to earn an automatic trip to the NCAA women's tournament for the second year in a row. They lost to Texas in the first round.

Roster
Sources:

Schedule
Sources:

|-
!colspan=9 style=| Non-conference regular Schedule

|-
!colspan=9 style=| Southland Conference Schedule

|-
!colspan=9 style=| Southland Women's Tournament

|-
!colspan=9 style=| WBI

See also
2017–18 Central Arkansas Bears basketball team

References

Central Arkansas Sugar Bears basketball seasons
Central Arkansas
Central Arkansas Bears basketball team
Central Arkansas Bears basketball team
Central Arkansas